The September 2010 Quetta bombing occurred on 3 September 2010 in Quetta, Pakistan. At least 73 people were killed and 206 injured when a bomb exploded in a Quds Day procession which Shias were carrying out to express solidarity with Palestinians.

Background
Pakistan, which has a mostly Sunni population, has seen sectarian attacks against minorities including Shias, who account for about 35–40% of Pakistan's population, and are the followers of the Prophet's progeny. Two days prior to these attacks dozens of Shias were killed in a similar attack in Lahore. Sunni militant groups like Lashkar-e-Jhangvi and Sipah-e-Sahaba Pakistan which operate in Pakistan have for years targeted minorities including Shias.

On the day prior to this attack Pakistan's interior minister Rehman Malik had asked the Shia community not to hold large gatherings due to security concerns.

Attack
The procession was to mark the Quds Day event staged every year by the Shia community to oppose Israel's occupation of Jerusalem. The rally drew an estimated 2,500 participants, mostly Shiias. The size of the blast caused a stampede. The explosion occurred in the Meezan chowk area of the town. The bomb exploded around 3:05 pm local time. It was estimated that the suicide bomber used about 15 kilograms of explosives.

Responsibility
Lashkar-e-Jhangvi claimed responsibility for the attack and said a 22-year-old suicide bomber, Rashid Moaawia, carried out the attack.

Aftermath
Following the blast, widespread protests erupted in the city with gunfire being heard across the city. Several shops were burnt by the protesters. People were seen lying on the roads to avoid gunfire, while others set fire to vehicles and buildings to vent their anger.

After the blast, police cordoned off the area and fired in the air to hold back people trying to search for their relatives. Shops and schools remained closed the following day. Security was also stepped up at mosques across Pakistan. Thousands attended a funeral mass in Quetta.

Reactions
Prime Minister Yousaf Raza Gillani condemned the attack and ordered an investigation. Interior Minister Rehman Malik told the press that militants want to encourage sectarianism in an effort to destabilise the government following a series of military offensives against them. He also claimed that Punjabi, such as Lashkar-e-Jhangvi, and al-Qaida and the Tehrik-e-Taliban are one and the same. Shiite Conference, Balochistan announced a 40-day mourning period in line with Shia custom.

UN Secretary General Ban Ki-moon's spokesman said "These attacks, which deliberately targeted Shiite Muslims and killed or injured scores of civilians, are unacceptable."

Condemning the attacks the White House stated "To target innocent civilians during the Muslim holy month of Ramadan at an already difficult time as the country is working hard to recover from terrible flooding caused by monsoons makes these acts even more reprehensible."

See also

Sectarian violence in Pakistan
List of terrorist incidents in Pakistan since 2001
Persecution of Shia Muslims
Persecution of Hazara people

References

External links
Video: Scores killed in suicide attack on Pakistan Shia rally, Al Jazeera English

2010 murders in Pakistan
Mass murder in 2010
2010s crimes in Quetta
Persecution of Hazaras
Terrorist incidents in Pakistan in 2010
Islamic terrorism in Pakistan
Suicide bombings in Pakistan
Terrorist incidents in Quetta
Spree shootings in Pakistan
21st-century human rights abuses
Religious pluralism
Arson in Pakistan
Violence against Shia Muslims in Pakistan
Islamic terrorist incidents in 2010
September 2010 events in Pakistan